The Llama District refers to:

Mariscal Luzuriaga Province, in the Ancash Region, Peru
In the Cajamarca Region, the Chota Province of Peru